Chaimae El Hayti is a Moroccan karateka. She won the gold medal in the women's 50kg event at the 2021 Islamic Solidarity Games held in Konya, Turkey. She won one of the bronze medals in the women's 50kg event at the 2022 Mediterranean Games held in Oran, Algeria.

She lost her bronze medal match in the women's 50kg event at the 2021 World Karate Championships held in Dubai, United Arab Emirates.

Achievements

References

External links 
 

Living people
Year of birth missing (living people)
Place of birth missing (living people)
Moroccan female karateka
Competitors at the 2022 Mediterranean Games
Mediterranean Games medalists in karate
Mediterranean Games bronze medalists for Morocco
Islamic Solidarity Games medalists in karate
Islamic Solidarity Games competitors for Morocco
21st-century Moroccan women